Elections to West Lothian Council were held on 1 May 2003, the same day as the other Scottish local government elections and the Scottish Parliament general election. The election was the last one using the old FPTP based ward system, and saw Labour retaining their majority on the council.

Election results

Ward results

References

2003 Scottish local elections
2003